Hexalectris (crested coralroot) is a genus of the family Orchidaceae, comprising 10 known species of fully myco-heterotrophic orchids. These species are found in North America, with the center of diversity in northern Mexico. None of the species are particularly common. Hexalectris spicata has a wide distribution and is likely the most abundant member of the genus, but is nevertheless infrequent throughout its range. Other species are rare, and some, such as H. colemanii, are threatened or endangered. All species that have been studied form associations with ectomycorrhizal fungi that are likely linked to surrounding trees. Many Hexalectris species are found in association with oak trees (Quercus), which are ectomycorrhizal.

Species
Species accepted as of June 2014:

References

External links

Bletiinae
Epidendreae genera
Orchids of North America
Myco-heterotrophic orchids
Taxa named by Constantine Samuel Rafinesque